"Spring Affair" is a song by American singer and songwriter Donna Summer from her 1976 album Four Seasons of Love. The song (which represents the "spring" phase of the concept album) tells of the beginning of a new relationship. "Spring Affair" is more than eight minutes long, though it was edited for release as a single. The song peaked at number 15 in Spain singles charts and number 3 in Spain Radio chart.

"Spring Affair" was sampled extensively on "Super Disco" by Alex Gopher and Étienne de Crécy from Super Discount (1996).

Track listing
Standard release
 "Spring Affair" – 3:39
 "Come With Me" – 4:20

Mexican 7-inch single (RCA Victor SP-4696)
 "Spring Affair" (Parte 1)
 "Spring Affair" (Parte 2)

Germany 7-inch single (Atlantic 10 884N)
 "Spring Affair" – 3:39
 "Winter Melody" – 3:51

Weekly charts

References

Donna Summer songs
1976 singles
1976 songs
Songs written by Pete Bellotte
Songs written by Giorgio Moroder
Songs written by Donna Summer
Casablanca Records singles
Song recordings produced by Giorgio Moroder